Ron Jorgensen (born May 17, 1957) is the Iowa State Representative from the 6th District.  A Republican, he has served in the Iowa House of Representatives since 2011.  Smith was born in Sioux City, Iowa, United States.  He has a B.S. in business administration from Morningside College and an M.B.A. from the University of South Dakota.  Jorgensen works as Vice President for Business and Finance at Morningside College.

, Jorgensen serves on several committees in the Iowa House – the Economic Growth, Labor, and Transportation committees.  He also serves as the chair of the Education committee and as a member of the Education Appropriations Subcommittee.

Biography
Ron Jorgensen has been a lifelong resident of Sioux City and the Morningside area. He graduated from East High School in 1975 and then received a bachelor's degree in Business Administration from Morningside College in 1979. Jorgensen also earned a Masters of Business Administration Degree from the University of South Dakota and is a Certified Management Accountant and Certified Cash Manager.

For the past 14 years, Jorgensen has been the Vice President for Business and Finance at Morningside College. Prior to working at the college he was a Vice President and Chief Financial Officer for a local bank in Sioux City. Jorgensen served on the Sioux City School Board for six years, two of those years as board president. He has also served on numerous other local non-profit boards.

Jorgensen has been married to his wife, Kathy, for the last 30 years. They have two sons, Corey, 26, and Eric, 21. His family are members of the Morningside Lutheran Church.

Electoral history
*incumbent

References

External links

 Representative Ron Jorgensen official Iowa General Assembly site
 
 Financial information (state office) at the National Institute for Money in State Politics
 Jorgensen's Iowa House Republicans biography

1957 births
Morningside University alumni
University of South Dakota alumni
Republican Party members of the Iowa House of Representatives
Living people
Politicians from Sioux City, Iowa
21st-century American politicians